Brenda Venus is an American actress, model, author, and filmmaker.

Early life
Brenda Gabrielle Venus was born on November 10, 1947 in Biloxi, Mississippi. Venus is of Native American and Sicilian ancestry.

Literary career 
Venus is the author of Secrets of Seduction and Secrets of Seduction for Women and a 2012 novella titled "Twelve Hours". Her books have been translated into 37 languages. Publishers William Morrow and E.P. Dutton sent her on a worldwide publicity tour making various appearances on TV, radio and press interviews. For over six years, starting in 1998, Venus wrote a popular column for Playboy magazine called "Centerfolds on Sex." She also produced, directed, shot and narrated the documentary film, Love and Sex in LA with seven Playboy Centerfolds and up-coming actors in LA.

Relationship with Henry Miller
When Venus was a college student, she purchased a book at an auction that contained an envelope with the address of famed writer Henry Miller. Venus wrote to Miller and they became "pen pals". Eventually Miller became her mentor and Brenda his muse. Miller wrote 1,500 letters that were collected into the 1986 book Dear, Dear Brenda – The Love Letters of Henry Miller to Brenda Venus.

Miller's long-time friend and confidant, fellow novelist and poet Lawrence Durrell wrote in the introduction to Miller's book Dear, Dear Brenda that:  "The role of Brenda Venus will keep its interest and importance also as a memorial of his last great attachment--an Ariel to his Prospero... She enabled him to dominate his infirmities and to experience all the Joys of Paradise."

According to writer Ed Millis, "Venus was a source of inspiration to the aging and ailing Miller. Brenda was all of 24 years of age, Henry was 84. She was a beautiful Southern belle, "The Boticelli of Mississippi"—he called her. Henry, the renegade intellectual, the writer, had taken millions of us to the sexy Tropic of Cancer and Capricorn. Now he was sick and slowly recuperating. He needed a lift in spirits... Brenda the Muse breathed life into her mortal charge and gave him reason to live. Miller gave her focus and fine tuning and wrote Venus over 1,500 letters which amounted to four-thousand hand-written pages. She responded in kind for over four years—the last four years of his life. "

Film and TV
Venus appeared in the Clint Eastwood film The Eiger Sanction and several other films. She also appeared as a host/narrator in Love & Sex in LA.

Her movie appearances include:

Russian play
On her birthday, November 10, Russia's prime minister Vladimir Putin requested that she visit Moscow as his guest. The invitation was to attend the opening performance of Venus, a play about her life. Members of the Bolshoi Ballet were cast along with Olympic Gold Medalist, Svetlana Khorkina, who played the title role.

Objet d'Art
Brenda has been the subject of several artists besides Henry Miller, including painter Harold Frank, photographer Ken Marcus, and former boxer Gary Dobry.

Playboy appearances

In the spring of 1997, Venus posed for a celebrity nude pictorial in Playboy Magazine.

She also appeared in Playboy in July 1986. According to the Playboy website:
"One of the women with whom Miller had a romantic, yet platonic, relationship was Brenda Venus. Her friendship with Miller lasted four years, until his death in 1980. In 1986, some of the hundreds of letters Miller wrote to Venus were published in the book Dear, Dear Brenda. Following the book's release, Venus posed for the July 1986 issue of Playboy."

References

External links

American film actresses
American radio actresses
American soap opera actresses
Living people
People from Biloxi, Mississippi
Actresses from Salt Lake City
1947 births
Muses
21st-century American women
Seduction